"Hey America" is a Christmas song recorded by James Brown. It appeared on his 1970 Christmas album of the same name. It was released as a single that failed to chart in the United States, but reached #47 on the UK Singles Chart in 1971.

Spin magazine characterizes the song as "a churning, overwrought orchestral groove, over which JB apparently improvises a totally incoherent rant about Christmas, peace protesters, God, partying, and (tellingly) wine."

References

James Brown songs
American Christmas songs
1970 singles
1970 songs